Marsy may refer to:

Gaspard (1629-1681) and Balthazard (1624-1674) Marsy, French sculptors
Marsy (actress), a French actress known during the late 19th century

ru:Марси